Heteroneura is a natural group (or clade) in the insect order Lepidoptera that comprises over 99% of all butterflies and moths. This is the sister group of the infraorder Exoporia (swift moths and their relatives), and is characterised by wing venation which is not similar or homoneurous in both pairs of wings.  Though basal groups within the Heteroneura cannot be identified with much confidence, one major subgroup is the leaf-mining Nepticuloidea.  Species in this subgroup include some of the smallest lepidopterans identified.

References

 

 
Insect infraorders
Neolepidoptera